is a Japanese musical arranger in distributors Being Inc., mainly in their label B-Gram Records.

In 1988, he debuted as arranger in debut single "Dakara Sono Te o Hanashite" by Japanese hard-rock band B'z. Until 1998 his arrangement work has been involved with many Being artist including Manish, Wands and Zard.

Although Masao is no longer working for Being Inc., he sometimes provided producing job for various artist such as Naomi Tamura, Maria, Color Bottle and Sonoda Band.

List of provided works as arranger
★ album ☆ single/coupling

B'z
B'z ★
Off the Lock ★
Bad Communication ★
Wicked Beat ★
Mars (B'z album) ★
Love is, Seasons, Itsuka no Merry Christmas (Reprise) (Friends (B'z album)) ★
The 7th Blues ★
Teki ga Inakerya (Loose (B'z album))★
Lady-Go-Round ☆
Kimi no Naka de Odoritai ☆
Be There ☆
Taiyō no Komachi Angel ☆
Easy Come, Easy Go! ☆
Itoshii Hitoyo Good Night… ☆
Lady Navigation ☆
Alone ☆
Blowin' ☆
Zero ☆
Ai no mama ni Wagamama ni Boku wa Kimi dake o Kizutsukenai ☆
Hadashi no Megami ☆
Don't Leave Me ☆
Motel ☆
Tokyo ☆

Zard
Good-bye My Loneliness (song) ☆
Koi Onna no Yūutsu, It's a Boy (Good-bye My Loneliness) ★
Fushigi ne... ☆
Mō Sagasanai ☆
Nemurenai Yoru wo Daite ☆
Dareka ga Matteru, Sayonara Ienakute, Ano Hohoemi wo Wasurenai de, Dangerous Tonight, Tooi Hi no Nostalgia, So Together Hold Me ★
In My Arms Tonight ☆
Stray Love ☆
Kimi ga Inai ☆
Yureru Omoi ☆
Season, Anata wo Suki dakedo, Listen to me, I want you, Futari no Natsu (Yureru Omoi) ★
Mō Sukoshi, Ato Sukoshi... ☆
Oh My Love (whole album) ★
Kitto Wasurenai ☆
Kono Ai ni Oyogi Tsukarete mo/Boy ☆
Konna ni Soba ni Iru no ni ☆
Ima Sugu Ai ni Kite, High Heel Nugi Sutete, Forever you, Mou Nigetari Shinai wa Omoide kara, Hitomi Sorasanaide (Forever You) ★
Take Me to Your Dream ☆
Teenage Dream ☆
Love ~Nemurezu ni Kimi no Yokogao Zutto Miteita~, Mitsumete Itai ne (Today Is Another Day) ★
Ai de Anata wo Sukuimashou Tomatteita Tokei ga Ima Ugokidashita ★
Tsubasa wo Hirogete ☆

Manish
Koe ni Naranaide Itoshii ☆
Kimi ga Hoshii Zenbu ga Hoshii ☆
Dakedo Tomerarenai ☆
Mou Dare mo Me wo Kinishinai ☆
Kirameku Toki ni Torawarete ☆
Best Friend ☆
True Heart ★

Wands (band)
Sabishisa wa Aki no Iro ☆
Toki no Tobira ☆
Sekaijū no Dare Yori Kitto ☆
Glass no Kokoro de, Sono Mama Kimi he to, Kodoku e no Target (Toki no Tobira) ★
Ai wo Kataru yori Kuchizuke wo Kawasou ☆

Tube
Remember me, Summer Girl, Hey Baby, Melody Kimi no Tame ni (Summer City) ★

BAAD
Kimi ga Suki to Sakebitai ☆
Donna Toki demo Hold me Tight ☆
Do you wanna hold me? ☆

Keiko Utoku
Dokomademo Zutto ★
Message ★

Miho Komatsu
Dream in Love, Otogi Banashi, Sabitsuita Machine Gun de Kimi wo Uchinukou, Aoi Sora ni Deaeta, Kono Machi de Kimi to Kurashitai, Kimi ga Inai Natsu (Nazo (album)) ★

Maki Ohguro
Stop Motion ☆

Field of View
Mou Ichido ★

Yumiko Morishita
Tears ☆
Somebody to believe ☆

T-BOLAN
Just Illusion ☆
So Bad ☆
Only Lonely Crazy Heart ★

Mi-Ke
Apple Love
Swan no Namida
Emerald no Densetsu
Omoide no Nagisa
Blue Night Yokosuka
Blue Light Yokohama

Seiichirou Kuribayashi
La Jolla ★
Summer Illusion ★
Kimi ga Inai ★

KIX-S
Tobikiri Lonely Night
Mou Ichido Dakishimete
Too Late

V6 (band)
Jiyuu de aru Tame ni ☆
Puzzle (A Jack In the Box) ★
Over ☆

Akina Nakamori
Tomadoi, Good-bye Tears (credited with alias name Max Brightstone)

Siam Shade
1/3 no Junjō na Kanjō ☆

Fairy Fore
Vivid (Final Fantasy: Unlimited) ★

Nobuaki Kakuda
Gifuu Doudou! ☆

Tomomi Kahara
As a person ☆
Be Honest ☆
Blue Sky ☆

TUNE'S
Dōbutsuen wa Taihen da ☆

Maria (band)
Yurari Sakurazora
Kanashimi Rensa

Yuko Nakazawa
Futari Kurashi

Yoko Minamino
Kiss-shite Loneliness ☆
Natsu no Obaka-san ☆

Hiroko Anzai
Necessary ☆
Andersen ☆

Under Graph
Majimesugiru Kimi he ★

List of provided works as producer

Maria
You Go!: We are Maria ★
Yurari Sakurazora ★
Day by day ★

Naomi Tamura
Pearly Gate ★

Color Bottle
Good Music ★

Hekiru Shiina
Precious Garden ★

Manish
Manish ★

Sonoda Band
Shift Rise

List of works as a supportive musician

B'z
The 7th Blues
Love Phantom
Off the Lock
Mars (B'z album)
Loose (B'z album)
Survive (B'z album)
Eleven (B'z album)

Gackt
Re:Born

Wands
Same Side

Television appearance
In Music Station as bassist: 
Manish: Kirameku Toki ni Torawarete
B'z: Fireball, Real Thing Shakes, Snow/Kizugokoro, LOVE PHANTOM, love me I love you, Negai, Itsuka no Merry Christmas, Odekakemashou, Ai no Mama ni Wagamama ni Boku wa Kimi dake wo Kizutsukanai, Zero, Be There

In online television Infinite Colors
Third episode

Magazine appearance
From J-Rock Magazine:
1996: Vol,8 (January), Vol.11 (April), Vol.14(June), Vol.19 (December)
1997: Vol.20 (January)
From E-cube Magazine:
2017/September Vol.186
From Sound&Recording Magazine:
2003/May

References

External links

Twitter (launched on 25 April 2018) 
Profile on Senzoku Gakuen of Music 
Bassist Masao Akashi Blog 

1957 births
Being Inc. artists
Japanese composers
Japanese male composers
Japanese music arrangers
Japanese record producers
Living people